The Rural Municipality of Lorne is a former rural municipality (RM) in the Canadian province of Manitoba. It was originally incorporated as a rural municipality on February 14, 1880. It ceased on January 1, 2015 as a result of its provincially mandated amalgamation with the Village of Notre Dame de Lourdes and the Village of Somerset to form the Municipality of Lorne.

The main reserve of the Swan Lake First Nation is located within the former RM.

Communities 
 Altamont
 Bruxelles
 Cardinal
 Mariapolis
 St. Alphonse
 St. Leon
 St. Lupicin
 Swan Lake

References

External links 
 
 Map of Lorne R.M. at Statcan

Lorne
Manitoba communities with majority francophone populations
Populated places disestablished in 2015
2015 disestablishments in Manitoba